The von Kossa histological stain is used to quantify mineralization in cell culture and histological sections.

Method
This is a staining method to illustrates mineralization such as Calcium and Potassium in tissues.

It is a precipitation reaction in which silver ions react with phosphate in the presence of acidic material.  Photo chemical degradation of silver phosphate to silver happens under light illumination.

Additional methods need to be employed to confirm the presence of calcium, such as Alizarin Red S.

References

Staining
Cell biology